"My Sound" is the debut single by Belgian DJ Laurent Wéry, from his debut album Ready for the Night. The song was written by Serge Ramaekers and Laurent Wery. It was released in Belgium as a digital download on 14 February 2009.

Track listing
 Digital download
 "My Sound" (Radio Mix) - 3:29
 "My Sound" (Club Mix) - %:29
 "My Sound" (Natural Born Grooves - 5:35
 "Eleven" (Creamminals Radio Mix) - 3:50
 "Eleven" (Monster A Capella) - 2:21

Credits and personnel
Producers – Serge Ramaekers, Laurent Wery
Lyrics – Serge Ramaekers, Laurent Wery
Label: La Musique du Beau Monde

Chart performance

Release history

References

External links
 Official Website
 Laurent Wery on Facebook

2009 debut singles
Laurent Wéry songs
2009 songs
Songs written by Laurent Wéry